Skeleton is the third album by Abe Vigoda. It was released by PPM Records on July 8, 2008.

Track listing
 Dead City - 2:56
 Bear Face - 2:21
 Lantern Lights - 2:18
 Animal Ghosts - 1:49
 Whatever Forever - 0:41
 Cranes - 2:20
 Live-Long - 2:55
 The Garden - 3:27
 Hyacinth Girls - 1:46
 World Heart - 1:37
 Gates - 1:46
 Visi Rings - 2:14
 Endless Sleeper - 3:49
 Skeleton - 2:12

References

2008 albums